This is a list of people from Benenden, Kent, England.

Born in Benenden
Aidan Crawley (1908–93), journalist and MP.
John Grimston, British peer.
Dora Honnywill (1870–1959), Olympic archer.
John Mayers (1801–65), cricketer.
George Mills (1793–1865), cricketer.
Richard Mills (1798–1882), cricketer.
Charles Wenman (1797–1828+), cricketer.
George Wenman 1805–37), cricketer.
John Wenman (1803–77), cricketer.

People connected with Benenden
Anthony Barker (1880–1963), artist, lived in Benenden.
Anthony Beattie (1944–), civil servant, lives in Benenden.
Jo Brand (1957–), comedian, lived in Benenden as a child.
Kitty Fisher (d 1767), courtesan, lived in Benenden.
Collingwood Ingram (1880–1981), ornithologist and horticulturalist, lived in Benenden.
George Miles (1913–88), organist, was curate of St. George's Church, Benenden 1919–22.
James Tinling (1900–83), partner in Power Jets Ltd, resided in Benenden at the time of his death.
Philip Turbett (1961–), musician and teacher, taught at Benenden School.

See also
 List of people educated at Benenden School

 Benenden
Benenden